Samten Migdrön (alternate nomenclature ) is a Tibetan text of historical importance for the historical relationship of Dzogchen and Zen as well identifying the view of its author, Nubchen Sangye Yeshe.

Namkhai Norbu et al. (1986: p. 23) identify Nubchen Sangye Yeshe as the author of a treatise, Samten Migdrön (Tib. bsam gtan mig sgron).

Dalton (2003: unpaginated) in his introduction to the Anuyoga literature of the Nyingma states that:
Nubchen Sanggyé Yeshé is renowned for having preserved a number of tantric lineages through the so-called “dark period” of Tibetan history (roughly 842-978 C.E.), when state-supported monastic Buddhism fell into decline. Nubchen authored many works, including the Lamp for the Eye in Contemplation (bsam gtan mig sgron), an extensive discussion of early Tibetan contemplative systems.

Samten Gyaltsen Karmay wrote on the Samten Migron.

The Total Sphere in Six Aspects

In the Samten Migdron, the 'Total Sphere' (thig le chen po) is described as having six aspects:
'Sphere of the Ultimate Dimension' (dbyings kyi thig le)
'Sphere of the Purity of the Ultimate Dimension' (dbyings rnam par dag pa'i thig le)
'Sphere of Dharmata' (chos nyid thig le)
'Wisdom Bindu' (ye shes thig le)
'Sphere of the All-Beneficent (Samantabhadra)' (kun tu bzang po'i thig le)
'Sphere of Spontaneous Presence' (lhun kyi[s] grub pa'i thig le)

Extract and English rendering
Karmay (2007: pp. 107–108)  renders an extract of the Samten Migdron in English as follows (Tibetan set in Wylie has been included in References for probity, culled from page 108):
"Now, as for expounding the doctrine of Atiyoga, the excellent vehicle, the best and topmost yoga, the mother of all conquerors, its name is the Great Perfection. Why? Because it gives detailed teaching with a view to imparting direct understanding of the principle of this non-sought spontaneity with regard to all existential elements. The sense of the spontaneous essence, which is the innermost treasury of all vehicles and the great "universal grandfather" [spyi myes], is to be experienced directly by "self-awareness" [rang rig pas], but not as a thing to be kept in mind. It is to be made clear to the "self-awareness". How one is to know of it? In this vehicle of the high yoga, there is nothing that can be measured by the discriminative self-intellect as expounded in the tantras, authoritative works and precepts. Why is it so? Because all the so-called elemental particles have never grown new feathers or changed their colour from the beginning. It is the Buddha-nature, the "sphere of the great circle" [thig le chen po'i klong] of the "self-awareness". Who then has seen this as an object? Who has demonstrated the logic for seeing it? To what doctrine does one entrust it? With what cognition does one cognise it? All the elements are non-conceivable, because separately they have no substance."theg pa'i mchog rnal 'byor gyi phul yang tog/ rgyal ba ril gyi yum a ti yo ga'i don btsan pa ni/ mtshan rdzogs pa (p.291) chen po zhes bya ste/ ci'i phyir zhe na/ bsam gyis mi khyab pa'i chos thams cad ma brtsal lhun rdzogs pa'i don/ gcer grol go bar bya ba'i phyir zhib tu bstan te/ de lta bu'i theg pa thams cad kyi yang mdzod spyi mes chen po 'di'i ngo bo lhun gyis grub pa'i ngang nyid kyi don/ rang rig pas mngon sum khong du chud nas blor bzhag par byar yang med pa'i don chen po rang gi rig pa la gsal bar bya ba yang/ ji ltar shes par bya zhe na/ shin tu rnal 'byor gyi theg pa 'di la/ rgyud lung man ngag gi gzhung ltar/ dang po gzhal bya'i chos gcig la/ rang gi so sor rtogs pa'i shes rab kyis gzhal bar byar yang med pa ste/ de ci'i phyir zhe na/ chos so cog tu grags pa thams cad/ ye gdod ma nyid nas spu ma brjes mdog ma bsgur bar rang byung gi ye shes thig le chen po'i klong du sangs rgyas pa'i rang bzhin la/ dngos po gzhal byar su yis mthong/ gtan tshigs su (p.292) yis bstan/ grub pa'i mtha' ci zhig chol/ 'jal byed gang gis byas te/ de dag gi ngo bo so so ba med pa'i phyir ma dmigs so/

English Translations
 Dylan Esler: The Lamp for the Eye of Contemplation. Oxford University Press (November 25, 2022)

Commentary
Khenchen Palden Sherab has written a commentary on the Samten Migdron entitled: Opening the Eyes of Wisdom

See also
East Mountain Teaching

References

Further reading
Dylan Esler. The Exposition of Atiyoga in SM
Gimello, Robert M. & Gregory, Peter N. (1983). Studies in Ch'an and Hua-yen. University of Hawaii Press. 
Meinert, Carmen. Chinese Chan and Tibetan Rdzogs Chen: Preliminary Remarks on Two Tibetan Dunhuang Manuscripts
Samten Gyaltsen Karmay. The Great Perfection (rDzogs chen): a philosophical and meditative teaching.

Tibetan Buddhist practices
Tibetan Buddhist texts